Shane Rigon, (born 6 January 1977) and educated at Christian Brothers' High School, Lewisham, is an Australian former professional rugby league footballer who played in the 1990s and 2000s.

Playing career
Rigon made his début in the top grade in 1996 for the Roosters against Parramatta. He played for the Roosters from the interchange bench in their 2000 NRL Grand Final loss to the Brisbane Broncos.

Rigon played for the Bradford Bulls from the interchange bench in their 2001 Super League Grand Final victory against the Wigan Warriors.

Rigon later returned to Australia to continue playing in the NRL for the South Sydney Rabbitohs during a difficult time in the club's history as they finished last on the table 3 times in 5 years.  Rigon's last game in first grade was a 30–6 loss against Manly-Warringah in the 2007 qualifying final.

References

External links
Bio from South Sydney

1977 births
Australian rugby league players
Sydney Roosters players
Bradford Bulls players
South Sydney Rabbitohs players
New South Wales City Origin rugby league team players
Rugby league hookers
Rugby league locks
Rugby league centres
Living people